This is a list of Indian comics.

See also 
 Magazine
 Media of India

Lists
 List of newspapers in India
 List of radio stations in India
 List of Indian TV channels
 List of Indian films

References

 
Lists of comics by country
Comics